Pehrforsskalia is a genus of cellar spiders that was first described by Christa Laetitia Deeleman-Reinhold & A. van Harten in 2001.  it contains only three species, found only in Africa, Israel, and Yemen: P. bilene, P. conopyga, and P. shambaa.

See also
 List of Pholcidae species

References

Araneomorphae genera
Pholcidae
Spiders of Africa